Paleologa is a surname. Notable people with the surname include:

Margaret Paleologa (1364–1420), Italian noblewoman
Margaret Paleologa (1510–1566), Italian noblewoman
Maria Paleologa (1508–1530), Italian noblewoman

Italian-language surnames